Kamila Magálová ( on 16 November 1950) is a Slovak film and stage actress, singer, and entrepreneur. She is a triple nominee for the TV-based OTO Awards.
In addition to the performing arts, Magálová runs a hotel named after her in Čierna Voda.

Biography
Magálová is the daughter of conductor Ladislav Slovák and sister of actor Marián Slovák. She studied acting at the Academy of Performing Arts in Bratislava, graduating in 1975. From 1973 to 1982, she was a member of the Poetic Ensemble of the New Stage (Poetický Súbor Novej Scény) in Bratislava and since 1982 has been a member of the Slovak National Theatre Drama department (Činohra Slovenského Národného Divadla) in Bratislava.

Magálová is known to film audiences as one of the lead characters in the Marie Poledňáková films Líbáš jako Bůh (2009) and Líbáš jako ďábel (2012).

In 2012, she divorced Slavomír Magál, with whom she has two children, son Martin and daughter Daniela. Kamila has three grandchildren: Maria, Nina, and Gregor. Together with her ex-husband, she is the co-owner of the Kamila Hotel in Čierna Voda, Chorvátsky Grob, where she also lives.

Magálová has been a UNICEF Goodwill Ambassador representing Slovakia since 1995.

Selected filmography

Discography
 Dvanásť do tucta - Diskotéka Opusu 6 - Opus 9113 1047 , (1980) - "Vraj si vážny" - Kamila Magálová and Bezinky (Pavel Zajáček / Peter Petiška, Tomáš Janovic)

Awards and recognition

See also
 List of OTO Award winners and nominees

References

External links

 
 

 Kamila Magálová at SND
 Kamila Magálová at ČSFd
 
 Kamila Magálová at KinoBox
 Kamila Magálová at SFd
 Kamila Magálová at TCMd

1950 births
Living people
Actors from Bratislava
Slovak stage actresses
Slovak film actresses
Slovak television actresses
Businesspeople from Bratislava